The Pan Zareta Stakes is an American Thoroughbred horse race run at the Fair Grounds Race Course in New Orleans, Louisiana, each winter.  An ungraded stakes, the Pan Zareta is a 5.5 furlong sprint on turf open to fillies and mares four years old and up.  The race currently offers a $75,000 purse.

First run in 1966, the race is named in honor of the Hall of Fame racing mare, Pan Zareta who is buried in the infield of the Fair Grounds alongside two other horses, Black Gold and Tudor Tambourine.  All three of these horses died at the track, Black Gold and Tudor Tambourine while racing, and Pan Zareta in her stall on Christmas Day. Each year, the winning jockey lays a wreath on Pan Zareta's grave after the race.

Past winners

Winners since the beginning of the new century are:
 2021 - Brooke Marie (Adam Beschizza)
 2020 - Elle Z (Mitchell Murrill)
 2019 - Play On (Shaun Bridgmohan)
 2018 - Contributing (Joe Bravo)
 2017 - Triple Chelsea (Adam Beschizza)
 2016 - Kathballu (Florent Geroux)
 2015 - Thirteen Arrows (Mitchell Murrill)
 2015 - Good Deed (Brian Joseph Hernandez, Jr.)
 2014 - Seeking Ms Shelley (Roman Chapa)
 2013 - My My My Maria (Brian Joseph Hernandez, Jr)
 2012 - Inspired (John Velazquez)
 2011 - Beautician (Julien Leparoux)
 2010 - Double Espresso (James Graham)
 2009 - Precious Kiss (John Jacinto)
 2008 - Graeme Six (Julien Leparoux)
 2007 - Mykindasaint  (Gerard Melancon)
 2006 - (Cancelled due to Hurricane Katrina)
 2005 - Souris (Brian Joseph Hernandez, Jr.)
 2004 - Handpainted (Larry Melancon)
 2003 - Fuse It (Gerard Melancon)
 2002 - My Brent's Diamond (Frank Lovato, Jr.)
 2001 - Hallowed Dreams (Sylvester Carmouche, Jr.)
 2000 - Steal a Heart (Robby Albarado)

Going Back
 1999 - Zuppardo Ardo
 1998 - Sky Blue Pink
 1997 - J J'sDream
 1994 - Bayou Bidder
 1993 - Bayou Bidder
 1992 - Parisian Flight
 1991 - Firebrat
 1990 - Cathy Quick
 1989 - Avie Jane
 1983 - Monique Rene (5)
 1982 - Monique Rene (4)
 1978 - Famed Princess
 1977 - Regal Rumor
 1974 - Color Me Blue
 1973 - Color Me Blue
 1970 - Round Pearl
 1969 - Copper Canyon
 1967 - Victoria Lass
 1966 - Boston Babble

References

 The Pan Zareta Handicap at Pedigree Query

Fair Grounds Race Course
Ungraded stakes races in the United States
Horse races in New Orleans
Horse racing
Sprint category horse races for fillies and mares
Recurring sporting events established in 1966
1966 establishments in Louisiana